Prat-Bonrepaux is a commune in the Ariège department in the Occitanie region of southwestern France.

Population
Inhabitants are called Pratéens.

See also
Communes of the Ariège department

References

External links 
 

Ariège communes articles needing translation from French Wikipedia
Communes of Ariège (department)